Cidaria is a genus of moths in the family Geometridae. It was erected by Georg Friedrich Treitschke in 1825.

Description
Palpi clothed with hair and reaching beyond the slight frontal tuft. Antennae of male typically minutely serrated and fasciculated. Hind tibia with two pairs of spurs. Forewings with vein 3 from near angle of cell and vein 5 from above middle of discocellulars. Vein 6 on or from just above upper angle. Vein 10 anastomosing (fusing) with vein 11 and then with veins 8 and 9 to form the double areole. Hindwings with vein 3 from close to angle of cell. The discocellulars oblique and vein 5 from or from above their middle. Veins 6 and 7 stalked.

Species
 Cidaria antauges Prout, 1938
 Cidaria basharica Bang-Haas, 1927
 Cidaria deletaria Hampson, 1902
 Cidaria distinctata Staudinger, 1892
 Cidaria fulvata (Forster, 1771) – barred yellow
 Cidaria luteata Choi, 1997
 Cidaria nugata Felder, 1875
 Cidaria ochracearia Leech, 1897
 Cidaria ochreata Staudinger, 1895

References

 
 

Cidariini